, colloquially referred to as , was an Imperial University of Japan that existed between 1924 and 1946. This university was established in 1924 in Gyeongseong, known as Keijō during the period of Japanese occupation of Korea, now modern-day Seoul, South Korea. Keijō Imperial University was abolished by the United States Army Military Government in Korea (USAMGIK) in 1946, following the Japanese surrender to the Allies and the subsequent withdrawal of Japan from its occupation of Korea at the end of World War II. Keijō Imperial University was succeeded by the Seoul National University, which is today one of the flagship Korean national universities.

History
Keijō Imperial University was founded in 1924 as the sixth Imperial University of Japan during the period of Japanese rule, followed by Taihoku University, Nagoya University and Osaka University in 1928, 1931 and 1939, respectively. While the other Imperial Universities located in Japan were run by the Ministry of Education, Science and Culture, Keijō Imperial University was run by the Governor-General of Korea.

During the March 1st Movement, 31 out of 171 students who participated in the movement were from Keijō Imperial College.

Following the end of World War I, Korean nationalist groups initiated through movements the establishment of a Korean private nationalistic university, which was referred to as ‘The People’s University.’ In response, the Japanese regime established Keijō Imperial University in modern-day Seoul, 1924. Upon its establishment, Keijō Imperial University became the only operating university in Korea. All other educational and tertiary institutions immediately transitioned into three-year, non-degree-granting institutions. Keijō Imperial University was amongst nine Japanese imperial universities by the year 1939. Keijō Imperial University was the sixth imperial university to be established. Along with Taihoku Imperial University (which is now the National Taiwan University), Keijō Imperial University and Taihoku Imperial University were the only two Japanese universities that were established outside the Islands of Japan.  It was one of two Imperial University’s established in Korea by Japan.

Keijō Imperial University published original articles and abstracts in journals including Shinkeigaku-zassi (Neurologia), Seishin-shinkei-gaku zassi (Psychiatria Et Neurologia Japonica), and The Journal of Chosun. 

After the end of World War II, Keijō Imperial University was renamed to "Kyŏngsŏng University". After the war, Gyeonseong University was no longer considered a Japanese university, and it was closed by the USAMGIK on August 22, 1946, under US Military Ordinance No. 102. While speaking to Korean officials, the U.S. Military Governor stated that “we (U.S.) gave a basic law enacted which will place our national university on a level equal to the best in the world."

The remaining properties of Keijo University merged with Gyeongseong Industrial School, Gyeongseong Mine School, Gyeongseong Medical School, Suwon Agriculture School, Gyeongseong Economics School, Gyeongseong Dental Medicine School, Gyeongseong Normal School and Gyeongseong Women's Normal School into Seoul National University. Additionally, Seoul National University College of Medicine was established in 1946 through the merger of Keijō Medical School and Keijō Imperial University.

Controversies 
In the early twentieth-century, all 194 students enrolled at Keijō Imperial University purposely did not attend class as a form of protest towards comments made by staff. 185 students were suspended, and 9 students were expelled.

Graduate student of Keijō Imperial University’s Medical College, Kang Gi-pal, led South Pyeongan Province’s March 1st Movement.

In April 1908, medical students enrolled at Keijō Medical College withheld from attending a welcoming ceremony of the Japanese governor-general of Korea, Itō Hirobumi.

The Keijō Imperial University research team organised and conducted field studies on sampling of blood typing, as well as physical anthropology research from people representative of the Korean peninsula. The gathering of men and women by local police and administrative power had been conducted as measuring them was necessary for the progression of Keijō Imperial University’s physical anthropology research. In 1937, Keijō Imperial University extended its research of physical anthropology field studies to Manchuria and China. Keijō Imperial University’s field studies in Korea, Manchuria and China were financially supported by the Japanese government and research foundations.

Controversies surrounding Keijō Imperial University’s research of physical anthropology and blood typing is related to the use of a racial index [R.I. (= A%+AB%/B%+AB%)]. Professor Ock Joo Kim of Seoul National University  states “the Japanese researchers put Koreans as a race between the Mongolian and the Japanese. The preoccupation with constitution and race also pervasively affected the medical practice: race (Japanese, Korean, or Japanese living in Korea) must be written in every kind of medical chart as a default.”

Faculties and divisions

Law and literature 
 The division of law and literature encapsulated studies belonging to law, literature, history and philosophy.
 At Keijō Imperial University, students had the opportunity to publish their literary works. In a preparatory literature course, students published in the magazine titled ‘Seiryo’. In a regular course, students had the publish their literary works in the magazine titled ‘Jōdai Bungaku’.
 Western History Education at Keijō Imperial University was offered as a study at the university.

Medicine 
 Seoul National University College of Medicine was established in 1946 after the abolishment of Keijō Imperial University by the merger of Keijō Medical School and Keijō Imperial University. The first class graduated in 1947.
 The Governor-General of Korea's Office Hospital was developed into a hospital attached to the faculty of medicine at Keijō Imperial University in 1928. The hospital had a psychiatry ward which was the only psychiatric institution in Korea at the time. Results shared by Keijō Imperial University psychiatrics Kubo Kiyoji and Hattori Rokuro, the psychiatric ward had admitted 576 Japanese patients, and 508 Korean patients from its establishment to 1930.  
 Keijō Imperial University only had about 40 beds for psychiatric patients in 1928.
 Keijō Imperial University was under the jurisdiction of the Korean Governor-General. As there was not enough funding for both Keijō Imperial University’s medical department alongside the Governor-General of Korea Hospital, therefore, staff from the Governor-General’s Hospital were transferred to Keijō Imperial University’s medical department. At the Keijō Medical Professional School, professors, assistant professors and assistants lectured in Mental Science. The hospital connected to the university was expanded to have 222 beds with a total of 35 physicians, with staff including directors, medical officers as well as professors. Keijō Imperial University’s medical department contributed towards the Japanese Society of Psychiatry and Neurology up until 1945 by members of the medical department and professors of psychiatry. Studies at Keijō Imperial University included publications on insanity, symptomatic psychosis, sleep disorder, epidemiology, alcohol and morphine addiction, and schizophrenia. 
 Keijō Imperial University was the only institution in Korea to have psychiatric beds until 1931 when a psychiatric was established within the Severance Union Medical School Hospital.
 Twenty-nine research papers and abstracts on psychiatric treatments were presented and reviewed at Keijō Imperial University. Major research areas included biological psychiatry and biological treatment. During this time, Japanese psychiatrists had introduced German psychiatry into Japan and Keijō Imperial University. Professors who contributed towards this research included Professor Kubo, Dr. Hattori, Dr. Hikari and Professor Suits. Malarial fever therapy, as well as sulphur-induced fever therapy and insulin shock treatment were frequent research topics at Keijō Imperial University. Six more papers on psychotherapy were published at the university, two being on persuasion therapy, three being case reports on psychoanalytic therapy, and one paper being on Sigmund Freud. Psychoanalytical therapy research has shown evidence that there had been limited triads conducted in the follow-up of literal guidance, where further development was not noted. 
 Keijō Imperial University also conducted studies relating to pharmacology, psychology, pathology and parasitology. Amongst these, topics for medical research included the research into control of infectious diseases, hygiene and environmental health for Japanese and Koreans.

Engineering and natural science 
 This faculty or division was established in 1938 before the outbreak of World War II.

Japanese cultural policy and influence
Keijō Imperial University was established due to Japanese colonial regime. During the time of its establishment, there were only eight known Korean colleges within the country which had a tertiary level equivalent to Japanese secondary school. Due to Japan’s colonisation of Korea, Keijō Imperial University was deemed a Japanese university. Cultural policies aimed in increasing the level of Korean tertiary education, and there has been controversy surrounding the educational imperialism implemented through scholarly commentaries, both during the universities time being active, and after. Through the implementation of this university, Korean education became centralised. This meant that several Japanese ideologies were implemented into this education system, such as the implementation of students and teachers paying homage to Shinto shrines. Other forms of Japanese cultural implementation were the prohibition of religious instruction as part of official curriculums, as well as the Japanese standing as the givers of particular instructions concerning tertiary decisions.  The establishment of Keijō Imperial University was viewed by scholars as means of having a higher education institution in place for Japanese occupants of Korea, as well as providing political influence and advantage. Political influence included the suppression of growing Korean nationalism, as Japan was an occupying force. This was largely due to the want in preventing the People’s University from coming into fruition, through the influence of Japanese nationalism towards Koreans individuals such as through tertiary institutions. The founding of Keijō Imperial University allowed for the introduction of the modern four-year university system into Korea.

Statistics

1910s 
By the end of 1919, 79 out of the 141 students attending Keijō Imperial University had been expelled.

1930s 
For Korean individuals, admission into Keijō Imperial University was a very competitive process as the admission of Korean students was restricted to between one-fourth and one-third of the total number of enrolled students at Keijō Imperial University. By 1930, six years after Keijō University was established, the number of enrolled students was at 520. This was equivalent to 6.7 percent of the number of students enrolled at Tokyo Imperial University. Japanese students made up the majority of the students enrolled. Amongst two thousand graduates during the colonial period, the number of Korean graduates was at seven hundred, the other thirteen hundred being Japanese.
In 1934, the total enrolment of the Keijō Imperial University was 930 students. The percentage of Korean students which made up this number was of 32%. Although the Korean percentage rose in the coming years, namely in 1942 where the percentage of Korean students was at 39%.

1940s 
In 1943, Keijō Imperial University had 67 professors and 203 students who were Japanese. Three professors and 170 students were Korean.

Graduate statistics 
150 students received a doctor of medicine degree from Keijō Imperial University.

Faculty and alumni

Presidents

Faculty
 Yoshishige Abe - literature
 Reginald Horace Blyth - English author,  taught English and Latin
 Pek Nam-Un - Korean Marxist, taught economic history
 Motoki Tokieda - taught linguistics
 Hiroshi Nakamura - biochemist and historian
 Shinji Suitsu
 Akiba Takashi
 Suzuki Eitaro
 Hattori Rokuro
 T. Kawamura 
 Kiyoki Kubo – Kubo was offered a professorship at Keijō Imperial University when the medical school was established.

Most of the staff at Keijō Imperial University specialised in the fields of physical anthropology, publishing and composing a series of works on Korean physical anthropology which were included within the Journal of the Anthropological Society of Nippon.

Alumni
 Lee Hyo-seok - Korean writer
 Shin Hyeon-Hwak - Korean politician
 Choi Byun-ju - former Korean Supreme Court justice and politician
 Rimhak Ree - Korean Canadian mathematician

See also 
 Imperial Universities
 Seoul National University

References

External links

Seoul National University
Colonialism
Educational institutions established in 1924
Educational institutions disestablished in 1946
Schools under the old system of education in Japan
Korea under Japanese rule
Defunct universities and colleges in South Korea
1924 establishments in Korea